Barbara Turner Smith (born 1931 in Pasadena, California) is an American artist known for her performance art in the late 1960s, exploring themes of food, nurturing, the body, spirituality, and sexuality. Smith was part of the Feminist Movement in Southern California in the 1970s, and has collaborated in her work with scientists and other artists. Her work has been widely exhibited and collected by major museums including the J. Paul Getty Museum, the Hammer Museum, MOCA, LACMA, and the Art Institute of Chicago.

Education 
She studied painting, art history and religion as an undergraduate at Pomona College, graduating in 1953. In 1965, after raising three children, she returned to study at Chouinard Art Institute, making The Black Glass Paintings, a series of primarily black surfaces under glass. She received her MFA from University of California, Irvine in 1971. During her time at UC Irvine, Smith and other artists such as Nancy Buchanan and Chris Burden founded F-Space, the experimental art gallery where she launched her career as a performance artist (this is also where Burden’s notorious Shoot (1971) was staged).

Artworks and exhibitions 
Tracking her transition from housewife to artist, Smith's early work focused on collaged photographs of herself and her three children, impressions of portions of her body, and articles of clothing into her self-published photocopied artist books, made on a Xerox 914 that she leased and kept in her living room.

Titles like Broken Heart, Bond, Undies and Do Not Touch suggest the personal nature of her subject matter. As her marriage disintegrated in the late 1960s, autobiography and the creation of community by means of interaction with her audience became central to Smith’s art. She began to explore themes of “the body, food, nurturing, female desire, heterosexual relationships, sexuality, religion, spiritual transformation, love, and death."

Smith is best known for her performance work in the late 1960s that was at the forefront of feminist, body, and performance art. Cardinal performances by Smith include: Ritual Meal (1969), a dinner party where guests dressed in scrubs and ate with surgical instruments with footage of the space, nudes, and surgery played overhead; Celebration of the Holy Squash (1971), where Smith created an entire religion out of a vegetable husk, left over from a communal meal; Feed Me (1973), where she sat naked on a mattress in a bathroom during a performance festival with a selection of "food, wine, marijuana, and massage oil", while a looped recording played "feed me"; Birthdaze (1981), performed on Smith's 50th birthday, wherein she enacted her life story in relation to the male avant-garde; and The 21st Century Odyssey (1991–1993), a collaboration between herself and UCLA professor and scientist Roy Walford, a Biospherian and (at the time) Smith's partner. During the performance, she traveled the world and transmitted her performances back to the Biosphere 2, where Walford lived at the time, and the Biospherians responded.

A retrospective exhibition of her work, "The 21st Century Odyssey Part II: The Performances of Barbara T. Smith" was shown at the Pomona College Museum of Art in 2005, and later traveled to the Kennedy Museum of Art at Ohio University. Her Trunk Piece, along with video footage from past performances, were a part of the Orange County Museum of Art's permanent collection exhibition "Art Since the 1960s: California Experiments" (July 15, 2007 – September 14, 2008). Her Field Piece (1968–1972) was the central work of a show at The Box gallery in Los Angeles (November 17, 2007 – January 5, 2008).

Teaching experience 
In addition to her art practice, Smith has taught courses in performance, art history, sculpture, painting, and drawing at many institutions, including USC, Otis College of Art and Design, UCSD, UC Irvine, UCLA, San Francisco Art Institute, Illinois State University, Ohio State University, and Johnston College at the University of Redlands.

Selected collections 
 The J. Paul Getty Museum and the Getty Research Institute
 MOCA Los Angeles
 The Hammer Museum
 LACMA
 Pomona College Museum of Art
 The Art Institute of Chicago
 Frac des Pays de la Loire, Carquefou, France

Awards 
 Civitella Rancieri Visual Arts Fellowship in Umbria, Italy: 2014
 Durfee Foundation: 2005, 2009
 Women's Caucus for Art, Lifetime Achievement Award: 1999
 National Endowment for the Arts: 1973, 1974, 1979, 1985
 Women's Building Award, Vesta Award for Performance Art: 1983

Notes

External links
Finding Aid for Barbara T. Smith papers at the Getty Research Institute 
Barbara T. Smith, Remnants: Artworks from 1965–1972
Orange County Museum of Art
Barbara T. Smith:  Field Piece, Catalogue published by CIRRUS of installation/performance, Field Piece 1971

Living people
American installation artists
American video artists
Body art
Postmodern artists
Performance art in Los Angeles
Feminist artists
Artists from California
Pomona College alumni
University of California, Irvine alumni
American performance artists
1931 births
20th-century American women artists
21st-century American women